The Palace of Merkheuli is a ruined mansion in the village of Merkheuli in the Gulripshi municipality, Abkhazia, an entity in the South Caucasus with a disputed political status. It is commonly attributed to the Marghania (also known as Maan, Marghan), a clan of local nobles.

History 
The ruins stand at the north-east outskirts of Merkheuli. It consists of a stone building on a small plateau — remains of a nobleman's "palace" — and a set of fortified walls and a small tower dominating a small stream defile leading to the building. The entire complex can roughly be dated to the 15th century.

References 

Palaces in Georgia (country)